Physical causality is a physical relationship between causes and effects.  It is considered to be fundamental to all natural sciences and behavioural sciences, especially physics. Causality is also a topic studied from the perspectives of philosophy, statistics and logic. Causality means that an effect can not occur from a cause which is not in the back (past) light cone of that event. Similarly, a cause can not have an effect outside it's front (future) light cone.

As a physical concept
In classical physics, an effect cannot occur before its cause which is why solutions such as the advanced time solutions of the Liénard–Wiechert potential are discarded as physically meaningless. In both Einstein's theory of special and general relativity, causality means that an effect cannot occur from a cause that is not in the back (past) light cone of that event. Similarly, a cause cannot have an effect outside its front (future) light cone. These restrictions are consistent with the constraint that mass and energy that act as causal influences cannot travel faster than the speed of light and/or backwards in time. In quantum field theory, observables of events with a spacelike relationship, "elsewhere", have to commute, so the order of observations or measurements of such observables do not impact each other.

Another requirement of causality is that cause and effect be mediated across space and time (requirement of contiguity). This requirement has been very influential in the past, in the first place as a result of direct observation of causal processes (like pushing a cart), in the second place as a problematic aspect of Newton's theory of gravitation (attraction of the earth by the sun by means of action at a distance) replacing mechanistic proposals like Descartes' vortex theory; in the third place as an incentive to develop dynamic field theories (e.g., Maxwell's electrodynamics and Einstein's general theory of relativity) restoring contiguity in the transmission of influences in a more successful way than in Descartes' theory.

In modern physics, the notion of causality had to be clarified. The word simultaneous is observer-dependent in special relativity. The principle is relativity of simultaneity. Consequently, the relativistic principle of causality says that the cause must precede its effect according to all inertial observers. This is equivalent to the statement that the cause and its effect are separated by a timelike interval, and the effect belongs to the future of its cause. If a timelike interval separates the two events, this means that a signal could be sent between them at less than the speed of light. On the other hand, if signals could move faster than the speed of light, this would violate causality because it would allow a signal to be sent across spacelike intervals, which means that at least to some inertial observers the signal would travel backward in time. For this reason, special relativity does not allow communication faster than the speed of light.

In the theory of general relativity, the concept of causality is generalized in the most straightforward way: the effect must belong to the future light cone of its cause, even if the spacetime is curved. New subtleties must be taken into account when we investigate causality in quantum mechanics and relativistic quantum field theory in particular. In those two theories, causality is closely related to the principle of locality. However, the principle of locality is disputed: whether it strictly holds depends on the interpretation of quantum mechanics chosen, especially for experiments involving quantum entanglement that satisfy Bell's Theorem.

Despite these subtleties, causality remains an important and valid concept in physical theories. For example, the notion that events can be ordered into causes and effects is necessary to prevent (or at least outline) causality paradoxes such as the grandfather paradox, which asks what happens if a time-traveler kills his own grandfather before he ever meets the time-traveler's grandmother. See also Chronology protection conjecture.

Determinism (or, what causality is not) 
The word causality in this context means that all effects must have specific physical causes due to fundamental interactions. Causality in this context is not associated with definitional principles such as Newton's second law. As such, in the context of causality, a force does not cause a mass to accelerate nor vice versa. Rather, Newton's Second Law can be derived from the conservation of momentum, which itself is a consequence the spatial homogeneity of physical laws. 

The empiricists' aversion to metaphysical explanations (like Descartes' vortex theory) meant that scholastic arguments about what caused phenomena were either rejected for being untestable or were just ignored. The complaint that physics does not explain the cause of phenomena has accordingly been dismissed as a problem that is philosophical or metaphysical rather than empirical (e.g., Newton's "Hypotheses non fingo"). According to Ernst Mach the notion of force in Newton's second law was pleonastic, tautological and superfluous and, as indicated above, is not considered a consequence of any principle of causality. Indeed, it is possible to consider the Newtonian equations of motion of the gravitational interaction of two bodies, 

The ordinary situations in which humans singled out some factors in a physical interaction as being prior and therefore supplying the "because" of the interaction were often ones in which humans decided to bring about some state of affairs and directed their energies to producing that state of affairs—a process that took time to establish and left a new state of affairs that persisted beyond the time of activity of the actor. It would be difficult and pointless, however, to explain the motions of binary stars with respect to each other in that way which, indeed, are time-reversible and agnostic to the arrow of time, but with such a direction of time established, the entire evolution system could then be completely determined.

The possibility of such a time-independent view is at the basis of the deductive-nomological (D-N) view of scientific explanation, considering an event to be explained if it can be subsumed under a scientific law. In the D-N view, a physical state is considered to be explained if, applying the (deterministic) law, it can be derived from given initial conditions. (Such initial conditions could include the momenta and distance from each other of binary stars at any given moment.) Such 'explanation by determinism' is sometimes referred to as causal determinism. A disadvantage of the D-N view is that causality and determinism are more or less identified. Thus, in classical physics, it was assumed that all events are caused by earlier ones according to the known laws of nature, culminating in Pierre-Simon Laplace's claim that if the current state of the world were known with precision, it could be computed for any time in the future or the past (see Laplace's demon). However, this is usually referred to as Laplace determinism (rather than 'Laplace causality') because it hinges on determinism in mathematical models as dealt with in the mathematical Cauchy problem. 

Confusion between causality and determinism is particularly acute in quantum mechanics, this theory being acausal in the sense that it is unable in many cases to identify the causes of actually observed effects or to predict the effects of identical causes, but arguably deterministic in some interpretations (e.g. if the wave function is presumed not to actually collapse as in the many-worlds interpretation, or if its collapse is due to hidden variables, or simply redefining determinism as meaning that probabilities rather than specific effects are determined).

Distributed causality
Theories in physics like the butterfly effect from chaos theory open up the possibility of a type of distributed parameter systems in causality.  The butterfly effect theory proposes:
"Small variations of the initial condition of a nonlinear dynamical system may produce large variations in the long term behavior of the system." This opens up the opportunity to understand a distributed causality.

A related way to interpret the butterfly effect is to see it as highlighting the difference between the application of the notion of causality in physics and a more general use of causality as represented by Mackie's INUS conditions. In classical (Newtonian) physics, in general, only those conditions are (explicitly) taken into account, that are both necessary and sufficient. For instance, when a massive sphere is caused to roll down a slope starting from a point of unstable equilibrium, then its velocity is assumed to be caused by the force of gravity accelerating it; the small push that was needed to set it into motion is not explicitly dealt with as a cause. In order to be a physical cause there must be a certain proportionality with the ensuing effect. A distinction is drawn between triggering and causation of the ball's motion. By the same token the butterfly can be seen as triggering a tornado, its cause being assumed to be seated in the atmospherical energies already present beforehand, rather than in the movements of a butterfly.

Causal dynamical triangulation

Causal dynamical triangulation (abbreviated as "CDT") invented by Renate Loll, Jan Ambjørn and Jerzy Jurkiewicz, and popularized by Fotini Markopoulou and Lee Smolin, is an approach to quantum gravity that like loop quantum gravity is background independent. This means that it does not assume any pre-existing arena (dimensional space), but rather attempts to show how the spacetime fabric itself evolves. The Loops '05 conference, hosted by many loop quantum gravity theorists, included several presentations which discussed CDT in great depth, and revealed it to be a pivotal insight for theorists. It has sparked considerable interest as it appears to have a good semi-classical description. At large scales, it re-creates the familiar 4-dimensional spacetime, but it shows spacetime to be 2-dimensional near the Planck scale, and reveals a fractal structure on slices of constant time. Using a structure called a simplex, it divides spacetime into tiny triangular sections. A simplex is the generalized form of a triangle, in various dimensions. A 3-simplex is usually called a tetrahedron, and the 4-simplex, which is the basic building block in this theory, is also known as the pentatope, or pentachoron. Each simplex is geometrically flat, but simplices can be "glued" together in a variety of ways to create curved spacetimes. Where previous attempts at triangulation of quantum spaces have produced jumbled universes with far too many dimensions, or minimal universes with too few, CDT avoids this problem by allowing only those configurations where cause precedes any effect. In other words, the timelines of all joined edges of simplices must agree.

Thus, maybe, causality lies in the foundation of the spacetime geometry.

Causal sets

In causal set theory, causality takes an even more prominent place. The basis for this approach to quantum gravity is in a theorem by David Malament. This theorem states that the causal structure of a spacetime suffices to reconstruct its conformal class, so knowing the conformal factor and the causal structure is enough to know the spacetime. Based on this, Rafael Sorkin proposed the idea of Causal Set Theory, which is a fundamentally discrete approach to quantum gravity. The causal structure of the spacetime is represented as a Poset, while the conformal factor can be reconstructed by identifying each poset element with a unit volume.

Interaction, force and the conservation of momentum
By physical causation is meant an effect that was caused by physical interference propagated by force from object A to object B. Momentum is propagated by force according to the Noether's theorem applied to translational invariance in Lagrangian field theory, which is used to describe the fundamental forces of nature when applied to the standard model.

See also

  (general)

References

Further reading
Bohm, David. (2005). Causality and Chance in Modern Physics. London: Taylor and Francis.
Espinoza, Miguel (2006). Théorie du déterminisme causal. Paris: L'Harmattan. .

External links
 Causal Processes, Stanford Encyclopedia of Philosophy
 Caltech Tutorial on Relativity — A nice discussion of how observers moving relatively to each other see different slices of time.
 Faster-than-c signals, special relativity, and causality. This article explains that faster than light signals do not necessarily lead to a violation of causality.

Causality
Concepts in physics
Philosophy of physics
Time travel

ko:인과율
it:Sistema causale
ja:因果律